Pieve di Ledro was a comune (municipality) in Trentino in the Italian region Trentino-Alto Adige/Südtirol. On January 1, 2010 it merged (with Bezzecca, Concei, Molina di Ledro, Tiarno di Sopra and Tiarno di Sotto) in the new municipality of Ledro, as its municipal seat. It is located about 35 km southwest of Trento.

On July 18, 1866 the village was the theatre of a battle part of the Third Italian War of Independence. It was the prelude of the Battle of Bezzecca.

References

External links

 Pieve di Ledro page on Ledro official website

Frazioni of Ledro
Former municipalities of Trentino